The Koro language is an East Manus language spoken by approximately 900 people on northeastern Manus Island and on Los Negros Island to the east in Manus Province of Papua New Guinea. It has SVO word order.

References

Manus languages
Languages of Papua New Guinea